The Ladies Norwegian Challenge was a professional golf tournament on the Swedish Golf Tour and the LET Access Series, held in Norway.

Winners

See also
Ladies Norwegian Open

References

External links

LET Access Series events
Swedish Golf Tour (women) events
Golf tournaments in Norway